Blind Date is a British dating game show first produced by London Weekend Television. An unscreened pilot was made with comic Duncan Norvelle as presenter but it was eventually hosted by Cilla Black, who already hosted the LWT series, Surprise Surprise. Blind Date originally ran on Saturday nights from 30 November 1985 to 31 May 2003 on ITV.

The show returned in 2017 on Channel 5, 2 years since the death of the original presenter, Cilla Black. The new series began airing on 17 June 2017 in its usual Saturday night slot and is produced by So Television, Olga TV and Stellify Media, a firm part-owned by Sony Pictures Television. Paul O'Grady presents the revived series. Melanie Sykes became the new voice of the show, taking over the role most famously held by Graham Skidmore in the original series.

Series overview

Original (ITV) (1985–2003)

Series

Specials

Revival (Channel 5) (2017-2019)

Series

Transmissions

Original

Series 14

Series 15

Series 16

Series 17

Series 18

Revival

Series 1 (19)

Series 2 (20)

Series 3 (21)

Series 4 (22)

References

Lists of British reality television series episodes